Ignacio Rodríguez Galván is considered to be the first Mexican Romantic writer. He was born in Tizayuca, Hidalgo, Mexico in 1816 and died in Havana, Cuba in 1842 at age 26 from yellow fever. During his short life, much of his poetry and plays were concerned with the political situation in Mexico and include works such as Profecía de Guatimoc, Al baile del señor Presidente, Adiós, oh patria mía and La gota de hiel. He also founded a newspaper called Año Nuevo, writing for it as well.

References

1816 births
1842 deaths
19th-century Mexican writers
19th-century male writers
Mexican male writers
People from Hidalgo (state)